The 1970 Calabrian regional election took place on 7–8 June 1970 in Calabria, Italy.

Events
Christian Democracy was by far the largest party and Christian Democrat Antonio Guarasci formed a government with the support of the Italian Socialist Party and the other minor centre-left parties (organic Centre-left). Guarasci was replaced by Aldo Ferrara in 1974.

Results

Source: Ministry of the Interior

Elections in Calabria
1970 elections in Italy